Juan Antonio Oré Gomero (7 November 1914 – 10 February 1994) was a Peruvian basketball player. He competed in the 1936 Summer Olympics.

References

External links
 

1914 births
1994 deaths
Peruvian men's basketball players
Olympic basketball players of Peru
Basketball players at the 1936 Summer Olympics
Sportspeople from Lima
20th-century Peruvian people